Stellan Olsson (6 July 1936 – 27 May 2022) was a Swedish film director. In 2012, his film Sven Klangs kvintett from 1976 was voted one of the 25 best Swedish films of all times.

Death
Olsson died on 27 May 2022 at his home in Helsingborg, aged 85.

Films
 1966 – Irland
 1969 – Oss emellan
 1971 – Julia och nattpappan
 1971 – Deadline
 1974 – Pappa Pellerins dotter
 1976 – Sven Klangs kvintett
 1978 – Bevisbördan
 1980 – Den enes död ...
 1981 – Det finns inga smålänningar
 1985 – Jane Horney
 1991 – Den stora badardagen
 1992 – Yasemin på flykt
 1994 – Good Night Irene
 1996 – Rose och drömmarna

References

External links
 
 

1936 births
2022 deaths
Swedish film directors
Swedish screenwriters
People from Helsingborg